Derby Academy may refer to:

Derby Academy (Hingham), an elementary and middle school in Hingham, Massachusetts, United States
Derby Academy (School of Dance), a dance school in Derby, Derbyshire, England
City of Derby Academy, a secondary school in Derby, Derbyshire, England

See also
Derby (disambiguation)